Damaris Lewis (born October 10, 1990) is an American model and actress. During her modeling career, she appeared in the Sports Illustrated Swimsuit Issues from 2009 to 2011. As an actress, she portrayed Blackfire on the DC Universe / HBO Max superhero series Titans (2019–present).

Early life
Lewis was born and raised in Brooklyn, New York. Her parents are West Indian from the island of St. Kitts. She studied with a conservatory-style arts concentration in dance at Fiorello H. LaGuardia High School of Music & Art and Performing Arts.

Lewis was discovered while performing with her childhood dance company, Restoration Dance Theater at Chelsea Piers. She waited until her second year of high school to sign a contract with Elite Model Management.

Career

Modelling
Lewis has appeared in campaigns for Black/Up, Clarins, MAC Cosmetics, L'Oréal, and Yves Saint Laurent. She has done editorial shoots for Sports Illustrated Swimsuit 2009, 2010, 2011; Essence, French Marie Claire, Self, Cosmopolitan, and GQ.

Nick Jonas and Modelinia selected her to do a three-day, feature-style interview video set. This platform exposed her to a wider audience.

Film and television
Lewis appeared briefly in the 2011 movie Limitless, dancing in a club scene with Bradley Cooper. She also appeared in Spike Lee's 2018 film BlacKkKlansman as Odetta.

She hosted a special presentation for The Africa Channel titled Prince! Behind The Symbol: Music Special, during his Welcome 2 America - 21 Night Stand at the Los Angeles Forum.

Lewis starred in the promo video that kicked off the 2013 NBA All-Star Game played in Houston, Texas. She went on to co-host NBA Style for TNT and NBA TV with Turner Broadcasting for three years. In 2016, Lewis co-hosted ESPN's City Slam Dunk Competition.

In 2018, Lewis played Jazmine Wintour, a member of the House of Wintour, on the FX channel series Pose. The same year she played the character Blackfire in season two of the DC Universe series Titans, and was later promoted to series regular for season three.

Dance
Musician Prince hired her as a dancer for his Welcome 2 Australia Tour 2012 with The New Power Generation. Lewis continuing touring with Prince & NPG for his 2012 Welcome to Chicago Tour, appeared with the band on Jimmy Kimmel Live!, and served as his muse for his closing show at SXSW 2013 in Austin, Texas. In the summer of 2013, Lewis traveled to Switzerland to perform with Prince's band at the Montreux Jazz Festival. She remained in his employ as a dancer until his passing in April 2016.

Personal life
Starting in 2009, Lewis has volunteered with organizations such as Project Sunshine and The Garden of Dreams, a nonprofit organization associated with Madison Square Garden, and Boys & Girls Clubs of America. Starting in 2014, Lewis began a three year run as chairwoman for The Garden of Dreams Foundation's annual prom, organizing proms for a select number of children in the New York tri-state area, who otherwise would not experience prom.

Filmography

Film

Television

References

External links

Damaris Lewis' official website
 
Marilyn Agency page

1990 births
Actresses from New York (state)
American film actresses
American television actresses
Female models from New York (state)
Living people
People from Brooklyn
21st-century American actresses
American people of Saint Kitts and Nevis descent